Josef Wilhelm (1892 – 1956) was a Swiss gymnast and Olympic Champion. He competed at the 1924 Summer Olympics, where he received a gold medal in pommel horse, and a bronze medal in team combined exercises.

References

1892 births
1956 deaths
Swiss male artistic gymnasts
Gymnasts at the 1924 Summer Olympics
Olympic gymnasts of Switzerland
Olympic gold medalists for Switzerland
Olympic bronze medalists for Switzerland
Olympic medalists in gymnastics
Medalists at the 1924 Summer Olympics
20th-century Swiss people